The 2020 Alabama Crimson Tide women's soccer team represented the University of Alabama during the 2020 NCAA Division I women's soccer season. The fall season began on September 19, 2020, and concluded with the SEC Tournament. The spring season began on February 19, 2021 and was set to conclude on April 10.  It was the program's 29th season fielding a women's varsity soccer team. The 2020 season was Wes Hart's 5th year as head coach for the program.

Effect of the Covid-19 Pandemic 
The SEC was one of the few conferences to play a fall season, with each team playing eight conference games, with the SEC Tournament in November.

On November 4, 2020, the NCAA approved a plan for college soccer to also be played in the spring, along with the 2020 NCAA Division I Women's Soccer Tournament.

Roster

Matches

Fall season

Regular season

SEC Tournament

Spring season

References 

Alabama Crimson Tide women's soccer
Alabama Crimson Tide